Dvojka (formerly STV2) is a Slovak television channel owned and operated by RTVS.

Logo history

External links
Official website
Program TV Dvojka

Mass media in Slovakia
Television channels in Slovakia
Television channels and stations established in 1970
Television channels and stations established in 1993
Radio and Television of Slovakia